This is a list of list articles of cities in Central America.

Lists of cities in Central America
 List of largest cities in Central America

By country
 Cantons of Costa Rica
 List of cities in El Salvador
 List of cities in Panama
 List of municipalities in Belize
 List of places in Guatemala
 Municipalities of Honduras
 Municipalities of Nicaragua

See also

 List of cities in Mexico
 Lists of cities

References

Lists of cities in the Americas
Cities